The 1990 National Rowing Championships was the 19th edition of the National Championships, held from 20–22 July 1990 at the National Water Sports Centre in Holme Pierrepont, Nottingham. There was a record entry of 653 crews and over 2,000 competitors competing for 64 titles. Simon Larkin won a record equalling fourth singles sculls title (Kenny Dwan also won four times).

Senior

Medal summary

Lightweight

Medal summary

Junior

Medal summary

Coastal

Medal summary 

Key

References 

British Rowing Championships
British Rowing Championships
British Rowing Championships